The Commons Select Committee of Privileges is appointed by the House of Commons to consider specific matters relating to privileges referred to it by the House.

It came into being on 7 January 2013 as one half of the replacements for the Committee on Standards and Privileges. The latter committee was divided into the Committee on Standards and Committee of Privileges in order that the Standards Committee might employ lay members.

Membership
As of July 2022, the members of the committee were as follows:

References

External links 
 The Committee's website

Select Committees of the British House of Commons